The Brazilian Catholic Apostolic Church (ICAB) is an independent Catholic Christian church established in 1945 by excommunicated Brazilian Catholic bishop Carlos Duarte Costa. The Brazilian Catholic Apostolic Church is the largest independent Catholic church in Brazil, with 560,781 members as of 2010, and 26 dioceses as of 2021; internationally, it has an additional 6 dioceses and 6 provinces. It is governed by a president bishop and the Episcopal Council. Its current president of the Episcopal Council is Josivaldo Pereira de Oliveira. The church's administration is in Brasilia, Brazil.

The Brazilian Catholic Apostolic Church is the mother church of an international communion called the Worldwide Communion of Catholic Apostolic Churches, though there is no evidence of any recent activity.

History

Costa was an outspoken critic of the regime of Brazilian president Getúlio Vargas (1930–1945) and of the Vatican's alleged relationship with fascist regimes. He also publicly criticized the dogma of papal infallibility and Catholic doctrines on divorce and clerical celibacy. As a result of his outspoken views, Duarte Costa resigned from his office of bishop of Botucatu in 1937 and was appointed to a titular see.

In 1940, Cardinal Sebastião da Silveira Cintra, archbishop of Rio de Janeiro, permitted Costa, as titular bishop of Maura, to co-consecrate Bishop Eliseu Maria Coroli. Costa continued to criticize the government and the Catholic Church, advocating policies that were regarded by the authorities as Communist. In 1944, the federal Brazilian government imprisoned him, but later freed him under political pressure from the United States and Great Britain.

In May 1945, Costa gave newspaper interviews accusing Brazil's papal nuncio of Nazi-Fascist spying, and accused the Vatican of having aided and abetted Hitler. In addition, he announced plans to set up his own Brazilian Catholic Apostolic Church, in which priests would be permitted to marry (and hold regular jobs in the lay world), and bishops would be elected by popular vote.

In June 1945, Costa established the Brazilian Catholic Apostolic Church (ICAB). Costa's act of schism resulted in his automatic excommunication from the Catholic Church. Later Costa was declared a —a person to be avoided by Catholics—and those Catholics who became adherents of the ICAB were excommunicated also. According to Peter Anson, Costa was excommunicated "for attacks against the papacy."

In 1949, the Brazilian government temporarily suppressed all public worship by the ICAB, because its liturgy and its clerical attire would result in confusion by being indistinguishable from those of the Catholic Church in Brazil and were tantamount to deception of the public. However, a few months later ICAB churches were permitted to reopen, provided that their liturgy would not duplicate the Catholic liturgy, and their clergy would wear gray clerical attire in contrast to the black attire worn by Catholic clergy.

Costa implemented reforms in the ICAB of what he saw as problems in the Roman Catholic Church. Clerical celibacy was abolished, though he himself never married and remained celibate; rules for the reconciliation of divorced and remarried persons were implemented; the liturgy was translated into the vernacular, and clergy were expected to live and work among the people and support themselves and their ministries by holding secular employment.

Shortly after founding the ICAB, Costa consecrated four bishops, Salomão Barbosa Ferraz in 1945, Antidio Jose Vargas and Jorge Alves de Souza in 1946, and Luis Fernando Castillo Mendez in 1948. Costa, Ferraz, and Mendez attempted to establish similar autonomous national catholic apostolic churches in several other Latin American countries. Costa was consecrator or co-consecrator of 11 additional bishops, each of whom took a leadership role in either the ICAB or one of the other national churches.

Ferraz left the Brazilian Catholic Apostolic Church in 1958. Ferraz reconciled with the Catholic Church in 1959 and his episcopal consecration was recognized as valid. However, Ferraz was excluded from church affairs such as the Roman Synod of 1960, even though he was present in Rome at the time, while the Vatican belatedly questioned the legitimacy of having recognized his status. Shortly thereafter, in 1961, Costa died and the ICAB underwent several years of tumult as dissensions, schisms, and multiple claimants to the patriarchal throne threw the church into disarray. After this period, the church found stability and growth under Mendez, Costa's successor.

Some sources seem to indicate that Mendez assumed leadership of the ICAB upon Costa's death in 1961. Bishop Antidio Jose Vargas initially stepped in as general supervisor, followed by Pedro dos Santos Silva as first president of the Episcopal Council, followed by the Italian-born Luigi Mascolo during the 1970s.

Doctrine 
The Brazilian Catholic Apostolic Church accepts the Nicene and Apostles' creeds. It observes seven sacraments (baptism, Eucharist, confirmation, penance, unction, matrimony and ordination) in common with the Catholic Church in Brazil. The church acknowledges divorce as a reality of life and will marry divorced persons after an ecclesiastical process of investigation and baptize the children of divorced persons. In the Brazilian Catholic Apostolic Church, papal infallibility and priestly celibacy are rejected. Clergy are also allowed to have secular employment and priestly confession is rejected.

Apostolic succession 
The church holds that apostolic succession is maintained through the consecration of its bishops in an unbroken succession back to the apostles of Christ. All ICAB bishops trace their apostolic succession back to Duarte Costa, a former bishop of the Catholic Church. It is widely believed that the ICAB's consecrations follow the Roman Catholic Tridentine rite in a vernacular version of the Pontifical, but this is not certain: the ICAB's rites were altered on several occasions, and uniformity in practice has never been enforced anyway; furthermore, the Tridentine rite in an unauthorized vernacular form would no longer be considered the Tridentine rite according to Catholic theology.

The church cites the unique case of Ferraz as evidence that its apostolic succession is valid, even by Roman Catholic standards. Just over a month after the church's foundation, in 1945, Duarte Costa consecrated Ferraz as bishop. Around fifteen years later during the pontificate of Pope John XXIII, Ferraz was reconciled with the Roman Catholic Church and was eventually recognized as a bishop, even though he was married at the time. Ferraz was not ordained or consecrated again, even conditionally; however he was initially held at arm's length by the Vatican while they examined his case, somewhat belatedly, and mooted the possibility of an affidavit to affirm that Ferraz, aged 80, and his Italian wife were chaste. He did pastoral work in the Roman Catholic Archdiocese of São Paulo until May 12, 1963, when he was appointed titular bishop of Eleutherna by Pope John XXIII. Ferraz participated in all four sessions of the Second Vatican Council, and Pope Paul VI appointed him to serve on one of Vatican II's working commissions. Upon his death in 1969, Ferraz was buried with full honors accorded a bishop of the Catholic Church. Since then, however, the Vatican has repeatedly expressed reservations about the ICAB's sacraments and does not recognize them; in 2012 Rome declared the ICAB schismatic and reaffirmed its negation of the ICAB's "illicit" orders.

International communion

Costa, Ferraz, and Mendez consecrated, or assisted in the consecrations, of dozens of bishops in various countries from the 1940s to the 1990s. Some bishops in the Costa line maintained formal ties with the ICAB, but the majority appear to have gone their separate ways to found or participate in independent Catholic bodies without ties to Costa's church. Such bishops have been declared doubtful at best by the new regime, citing the claim that a defect in proper intention exists in all bishops who have strayed from the ICAB.

Churches in full communion with the ICAB may be considered members of the Worldwide Communion of Catholic Apostolic Churches. However, there has been a fluctuating number of these churches, a current members list is apparently not available, and the last world conference was held in 2009 in Guatemala. Since that meeting there has been a reorganization of the Worldwide Communion of Catholic Apostolic Churches of those considered to have remained true to the teachings of Duarte Costa.

There is no independently verifiable evidence of significant activity of the Worldwide Communion of Catholic Apostolic Churches in recent years, and it could be presumed to have terminated. According to Edward Jarvis, the "ICAB has had difficulty in maintaining the unity and continuity of its worldwide communion (...). [The] priorities of each branch do not always seem to be in harmony ... and it becomes difficult at times to see what the point of having an international communion is supposed to be. In ICAB’s defense, perhaps, it cannot be easy to hold breakaway groups in a communion, however loose a communion it may be – it is almost a direct contradiction in terms."

Under Castillo Mendez, the ICAB created the Canadian Catholic Apostolic Church in 1988, ordaining Claude R. Baron as the first Canadian bishop. In 1997, Mendez agreed to intercommunion between the Brazilian Catholic Apostolic Church and the International Communion of the Charismatic Episcopal Church (ICCEC).

The year 1997 also saw the ordination of the first 'ICAB succession' bishop in the United Kingdom, namely John Christopher Simmons of Ashford, Kent. Simmons (1945-2003) was part of a small house church which fronted a prolific and well-documented ring of pedophilia and child exploitation, brought to light in multiple highly-publicised cases involving Roger Gleaves and Frederick Gilbert Linale. Both Gleaves and Linale received lengthy sentences; Simmons stood in as head of the church in their absence. The British branch of ICAB still exists, though currently in no formal relationship with the ICAB, and it has changed name several times since Simmons' tenure. The current leader of this branch, now called the Catholic Church of England & Wales, is James Atkinson-Wake, also known as David Bell.

In 2016, the former Speaker of the Australian House of Representatives, Peter Slipper, previously a priest in the Anglican Catholic Church in Australia, flew to Brazil to be ordained to the priesthood in the ICAB. The following year he was consecrated to the episcopate in Rio de Janeiro. He is the Bishop in Australia of the Catholic Apostolic Church in Australia (ICAB) and visited a Greek Orthodox church under this title.

Notes

References

Further reading

External links
  (in Brazilian Portuguese)

Christian organizations established in 1945
Christian denominations established in the 20th century
Catholicism in Brazil
Independent Catholic denominations
1945 establishments in Brazil